was a Japanese photographer.

Career
Kurata was born in Chūō-ku, Tokyo, 1945. He graduated from the Tokyo National University of Fine Arts and Music in 1968. He taught in secondary school and worked in oils, printmaking, and experimental movies.

He practised under Daidō Moriyama in an independent photography workshop in 1976.

Kurata won the fifth Kimura Ihei Award in 1980 for his first book, Flash Up. For the black-and-white photographs here, Kurata used flash and a medium format camera, resulting in a detailed portrait of a world of bōsōzoku, gangsters, rightists, strippers, transvestites, and so on: as Parr and Badger point out, these are old subjects; but in his "highly polished, detailed" work, Kurata "has an unerring instinct for pictures that suggest stories". Photo Cabaret and 80's  Family continued in this direction. This Japanese work of Kurata's is anthologized in his later volume Japan.

Kurata won the PSJ award in 1992. A long stay in Mongolia in 1994 led to the book Toransu Ajia, which continued color work of the Asian mainland started with Dai-Ajia.

In 1999 Kurata's book Japan won the Kodansha Publishing Culture Award for a work of photography.

Prints of Kurata's photographs are in the permanent collections of ICP (New York),  the Brooklyn Museum, and the Tokyo Metropolitan Museum of Photography.

He died on 27 February 2020.

Solo exhibitions

 "Street Photo Random Tokyo 1975–79". Nikon Salon, Tokyo and Osaka, 1979.
 "Photo Cabaret". Doi Photo Plaza, Shibuya, Tokyo, 1983.
 "Street Photo Random Tokyo 2". Nikon Salon, Tokyo, 1986.
 "Great Asia". Minolta Photo Space, Shinjuku, Tokyo, 1990.
"Quest for Eros" I. Mole, Tokyo, 1993.
 "Trans Asia". Nikon Salon, Tokyo; Visual Arts School, Osaka, 1995.
"Tokyo: Theatrical Megalopolis". O. K. Harris Gallery, New York, 1995.
 "Trans Market: Tokyo Kanda vegetable and fruit market". Nikon Salon, Tokyo and Osaka, 1996.
 Japan from the 70s to the 90s. Kodak Photo Salon, Tokyo, 1999.
"Quest for Eros" II. Galleria Prova, Tokyo, 1999.
. Epsite, Tokyo, 2008.
. Gallery Punctum, Tokyo, 2009.
"Trans Asia, again!" Place M, Tokyo, 2013.

Publications by Kurata
Following a title in Japanese script, an italicized roman-letter title is one provided on or in the book itself; a non-italicized roman-letter title is a mere gloss of the original title.
Flash Up: Street Photo Random Tokyo 1975–1979. Tokyo: Byakuya Shobō, 1980.  Black-and-white photographs. Includes one essay in English but also several in Japanese only; the captions too are only in Japanese.
Foto Kyabarē / Photo Cabaret. Tokyo: Byakuya Shobō, 1982. . Black-and-white photographs of Japan. Text in Japanese only.
Dai-Ajia (Great Asia). Tokyo: IBC, 1990. . 
80's  Family: Street Photo Random Japan. Tokyo: JICC Shuppankyoku, 1991. . Black-and-white and colour photographs of Japan. Text in Japanese only.
Toransu-Ajia (Trans-Asia). Tokyo: Ōta Shuppan, 1995. . 
Japan / Japan. Tokyo: Shinchōsha, Photo Musée, 1998. . The captions are in English.
Kuesuto fō Erosu / Quest for Eros. Tokyo: Shinchōsha, 1998. . 
Trans Asia, again! Tokyo: Place M, 2013. . Zine, published on the occasion of an exhibition at Place M of the same title.
Flash Up. Tokyo: Zen Foto Gallery, 2013.
Toshi no zōkei. Kamakura: Super Labo, 2015. .

Notes

References

Links and sources
 Iizawa Kōtarō. Tōkyō shashin / Tokyo Photography. Tokyo: Inax, 1995. . Despite the English subtitle, all in Japanese. Photographs by and essays on Kineo Kuwabara, William Klein, Masatoshi Naitō, Shigeo Gochō, Nobuyoshi Araki, Daidō Moriyama, Ryūji Miyamoto, Kyōichi Tsuzuki, and Yurie Nagashima, as well as Kurata.
 Profile at TPO Photo School.
 Review of Toransu-Ajia.
Ono, Philbert. "Kurata Seiji". Brief note at PhotoGuide Japan.
Parr, Martin, and Gerry Badger. The Photobook 1. London: Phaidon, 2004. .
 Sanjūroku fotogurafāzu: Kimura Ihei Shashinshō no sanjūnen (36 photographers: 30 years of the Kimura Ihei Award). Tokyo: Asahi Shinbun, 2005. . With sample photographs from each of the award-winners.
 Shashinshū o yomu: Besuto 338 kanzen gaido (Reading photobooks: A complete guide to the best 338). Tokyo: Metarōgu, 1997. . P.172. Review of 80's Family.

1945 births
2020 deaths
Japanese photographers
People from Chūō, Tokyo
Tokyo University of the Arts alumni
Street photographers